HWM may refer to:
 Harlow Mill railway station, in England
 Hazardous waste management
 Hersham and Walton Motors
 High water mark
 Hot Water Music
 Hull-White model